Vinnie Bagwell is an American sculptor and representational figurative artist.

Biography 
Vinnie Bagwell was born and lives in Yonkers, New York, where she resided in the town of Greenburgh for most of her early life. She was always interested in art even from a young age and began painting in high school. Completely untutored, she began sculpting in 1993 and since then has gone on to earn many awards and commissions from communities around the United States. She would go on sculpting until 1996 when she received her first real commission from the city of Yonkers for her piece The First Lady of Jazz Ella Fitzgerald.

Art 
Bagwell is known for her many works of social and representational sculptures. These sculptures tend to be cast in Bronze or Bronze resin which is her preferred material. Her works tend to reflect important African American figures and the struggles of enslaved people who were taken from their homes and their lives to become the property of someone else. Her goal as an artist is to help people be more aware of the struggles these people went through. She hopes that through her art, people will begin to fully comprehend everything that they sacrificed and had stolen away from them.

Enslaved Africans' Raingarden 
The Enslaved Africans' Raingarden is one of Bagwell's biggest projects. It consists of 5 sculptures depicting individuals who were some of the first enslaved people to be freed from slavery by the law prior to the conception of the Emancipation Proclamation.

Each sculpture depicts a different individual each with their own story and history. The project in total was a 12-year endeavor and was recently completed in 2020 with each sculpture currently on exhibition at the Yonkers Riverfront Library–located in the atrium at One Larkin Plaza, Yonkers, New York.

The sculptures are as follows
 I'Satta
 Themba
 Bibi
 Sola & Olumide

Victory Beyond Sims 
Victory Beyond Sims is a planned sculpture by Bagwell that is being created to replace the sculpture of J. Marion Sims in Central Park, New York that was torn down in 2018. After the relocation of the statue, the city called for a replacement sculpture. The four finalists chosen were Bagwell, Simone Leigh, Wangechi Mutu, and Kehinde Wiley. The city eventually decided on Simone Leigh in a 4–3 vote. The decision caused outrage amongst the community as they believed that Bagwell deserved to win.

Simone Leigh saw the backlash and decided to withdraw his proposal in order to hand the win to Bagwell. Leigh said in response, "I greatly appreciate that my proposal was selected by the committee. However, I am aware that there is significant community sentiment for another proposal. Since this is a public monument in their neighborhood, I defer to them and have withdrawn my work."

The statue is planned to be installed at some point in 2021 once the approval process and revisions have taken place.

Commendations 
 In October, 2020, Americans for the Arts awarded Bagwell the inaugural Jorge and Darlene Pérez Prize in Public Art & Civic Design award for he continued work in creating art for and supporting her community. The prize included a $30,000 prize as well as the ability to take part in additional learning opportunities and discussion with other nationally recognized artistic leaders.
 On April 1, 2021, ArtsWestchester awarded Bagwell with their annual Artist award alongside 6 other individuals. Her work on her Enslaved Africans' Raingarden project in Yonkers is what earned her the honor for this award.

Awards
In 2017, Bagwell was a recipient of the Trailblazers Award bestowed by the African American Advisory Board of Westchester County.

References 

Sculptors from New York (state)
American contemporary artists
20th-century American women artists
21st-century American women artists
Year of birth missing (living people)
Living people
20th-century American sculptors
21st-century American sculptors
People from Yonkers, New York
20th-century African-American women
20th-century African-American people
20th-century African-American artists
21st-century African-American women
21st-century African-American artists
African-American history of Westchester County, New York